King's Festival is an adventure module for the Dungeons & Dragons fantasy role-playing game.

Plot synopsis
King's Festival is an adventure scenario set in Karameikos. It functions as both a guide for beginning DMs and an introductory dungeon. The player characters (PCs) must rescue a cleric from a group of orcs to ensure that the King's Festival happens.

The presentation in King's Festival is simple, streamlined, and easy to follow, with staging hints and advice for first-time DMs, and concise setting detail in the read-aloud sections. Pre-rolled PCs are included for a quick start, and a pull-out Combat Sequence Table is included on the Player Reference Sheet. Also provided are a few recommended rules, adaptations, and clarifications, such as giving beginning PCs no less than a minimum number of hit points at 1st level to avoid starting a character at one hit point.

Publication history
B11 King's Festival was written by Carl Sargent, with a cover by Clyde Caldwell and interior illustration by Valerie Valusek, and was published by TSR in 1989 as a 32-page booklet with an outer folder. Editing is by Jim Lowder.  King's Festival is TSR product number 9260.  B12 Queen's Harvest is the sequel to this adventure.

Reception
Ken Rolston reviewed King's Festival for Dragon magazine in July 1991. He found the pull-out Combat Sequence Table a big help in conducting his Basic D&D game combat: "The summary and reference charts are effectively employed to help organize information for the rookie DM." Rolston felt that Carl Sargent did not "take a radical enough step to remedy the 1st-level character's chronic vulnerability to death from a couple of consecutive whacks from even weedy monsters", and suggested an alternative allowing a character to go unconscious and bleed to death unless bandaged by another character. He felt that the adventure "offers a quick, simple dungeon with a plenty of tricks and action and a few nifty touches". Rolston concluded the review by saying that King's Festival and Queen's Harvest "are absolutely the best introductory adventures in print for D&D-game-style fantasy role-playing games (FRPGs). Presented simply and clearly enough for young folks, these adventures are also challenging and entertaining enough for experienced gamers."

See also
 List of Dungeons & Dragons modules

References and footnotes

External links

Dungeons & Dragons modules
Mystara
Role-playing game supplements introduced in 1989